The 2020–21 Odisha Women's League is the 8th edition of the Odisha Women's League, the top Odia professional football league, since its establishment in 2011. East Coast Railway are the defending champions. The league is organised by the Football Association of Odisha (FAO), the official football governing body of Odisha, in association with the Department of Sports and Youth Services (DSYS) of the Government of Odisha.

On 27 February 2021, during the press meet and jersey launch ceremony for the 2020–21 season, the league was rechristened as Odisha Women's League. The ceremony took place in the presence of Principal Secretary of Department of Sports and Youth Services, Vishal Kumar Dev, and the Honorary Secretary of the Football Association of Odisha (FAO), Avijit Paul, at the Kalinga Stadium. On 28 February 2021, R. Vineel Krishna, Special Secretary to the Chief Minister Naveen Patnaik, and Director of Department of Sports and Youth Services graced the opening ceremony of the season as the chief guest.

Teams

Personnel

Squads

Standings

Statistics

Scoring

Top scorers

Hat-tricks

Result column shows goal tally of player's team first.

Own-goals

Result column shows goal tally of player's team first.

References

Sports competitions in Odisha
1
2020–21 domestic women's association football leagues